Lance Corporal Joe Calvin Paul  (April 23, 1946 – August 19, 1965) was a United States Marine killed in the Vietnam War who posthumously received the Medal of Honor for diverting an attack long enough to allow the evacuation of wounded Marines during Operation Starlite near Chu Lai, Vietnam, on August 18, 1965. The medal was awarded on February 7, 1967, during a ceremony in the Office of Secretary of the Navy Paul H. Nitze, who presented the award to his parents.

Biography
Joe Calvin Paul was born on April 23, 1946, in Williamsburg, Kentucky. He graduated from grammar school and attended high school for one year before enlisting in the United States Marine Corps on April 26, 1963, in Dayton, Ohio, shortly after his seventeenth birthday.

In August 1963, after completing recruit training at the Marine Corps Recruit Depot San Diego, he was transferred to the Marine Corps Base Camp Pendleton, where he underwent individual combat training with the Second Infantry Training Regiment, graduating in October 1963.

He then joined Company H, 2nd Battalion 4th Marines, 1st Marine Brigade, in Hawaii where he was promoted to private first class in December 1963 and to lance corporal in October 1964. With that unit, he sailed for the Far East, arriving in Chu Lai, Republic of Vietnam on May 7, 1965, where this unit was redesignated Company H, 2nd Battalion, 4th Marines, 3rd Marine Division.

On August 18, 1965, while serving as a fire team leader with Company H, LCpl Paul placed himself between his wounded comrades and the enemy and delivered effective suppressive fire in order to divert the Viet Cong long enough to allow the casualties to be evacuated. He fought in this exposed position until he was mortally wounded. He succumbed to his wounds the next day, August 19, 1965.

Joe C. Paul was buried in the Dayton Memorial Park Cemetery in Dayton.

Awards and honors
Paul's medals and decorations include:

 

 The United States Navy Knox-class destroyer escort,  (ex-DE 1080) was named for LCpl Paul.  The ship was christened and launched on June 20, 1970, and decommissioned in August 1992.

 Paul's name was inscribed on the Vietnam Veterans Memorial on Panel 02E, Line 063.

Medal of Honor citation
The President of the United States in the name of The Congress takes pride in presenting the MEDAL OF HONOR posthumously to

for service as set forth in the following CITATION:
For conspicuous gallantry and intrepidity at the risk of his life above and beyond the call of duty as a Fire Team Leader with Company H, Second Battalion, Fourth Marines, Third Marine Division (Reinforced) during Operation STARLITE near Chu Lai in the Republic of Vietnam on 18 August 1965.  In violent battle, Lance Corporal Paul's platoon sustained five casualties as it was temporarily pinned down by devastating mortar, recoilless rifle, automatic weapons, and rifle fire delivered by insurgent communist (Viet Cong) forces in well-entrenched positions. The wounded Marines were unable to move from their perilously exposed positions forward of the remainder of their platoon, and were suddenly subjected to a barrage of white phosphorus rifle grenades.  Corporal Paul, fully aware that his tactics would almost certainly result in serious injury or death to himself, chose to disregard his own safety and boldly dashed across the fire-swept rice paddies, placed himself between his wounded comrades and the enemy, and delivered effective suppressive fire with his automatic weapon in order to divert the attack long enough to allow the casualties to be evacuated.  Although critically wounded during the course of the battle, he resolutely remained in his exposed position and continued to fire his rifle until he collapsed and was evacuated. By his fortitude and gallant spirit of self-sacrifice in the face of almost certain death, he saved the lives of several of his fellow Marines.  His heroic action served to inspire all who observed him and reflect the highest credit upon himself, the Marine Corps and the United States Naval Service.  He gallantly gave his life in the cause of freedom.
/S/ LYNDON B. JOHNSON

See also

List of Medal of Honor recipients
List of Medal of Honor recipients for the Vietnam War

References

Inline

General

1946 births
1965 deaths
United States Marine Corps Medal of Honor recipients
United States Marines
American military personnel killed in the Vietnam War
People from Whitley County, Kentucky
Vietnam War recipients of the Medal of Honor
United States Marine Corps personnel of the Vietnam War